Eugene Francis McGee (June 26, 1882 – August 6, 1952) was an American lawyer and college football player and coach.  He served as the head football coach at Fordham University in 1905, compiling a record of 5–2. McGee was the valedictorian of Fordham University School of Law's first graduating class, in 1908.  With his law partner, William J. Fallon, McGee defended more than 125 homicide cases. The two also defended Nicky Arnstein in a 1924 case of conspiracy to carry stolen securities into Washington, D.C.  McGee moved to Shreveport, Louisiana around 1942, where he owned the Tri-State Boat Club and Cross Lake Inn.  He died in Shreveport, on  August 6, 1952.

Head coaching record

References

External links
 

1882 births
1952 deaths
20th-century American lawyers
Player-coaches
Fordham Rams football coaches
Fordham Rams football players
People from New Lebanon, New York
Fordham University School of Law alumni
Lawyers from New York City